Rosella is a rural locality in the Mackay Region, Queensland, Australia.

Road infrastructure
The Bruce Highway runs through from south to north.

References 

Mackay Region
Localities in Queensland